Seh Pud (also Romanized as Seh Pūd; also known as Sepūt) is a village in Bandan Rural District, in the Central District of Nehbandan County, South Khorasan Province, Iran. At the 2006 census, its population was 81, in 19 families.

References 

Populated places in Nehbandan County